Pluto’s Blue Note is a 1947 animated short film produced by Walt Disney Productions that stars Pluto. The film was nominated for the 1948 Academy Award for Best Animated Short Film but lost to Warner Bros.’ Tweetie Pie.

Plot
Pluto wakes up to the sound of two birds singing. He tries to sing along with them but is unsuccessful, causing them to fly away annoyed. Pluto also tries to imitate the sound of a bee and cricket, but he annoys them as well. Pluto then hears the sound of a radio beating at a nearby music store and discovers that he can emulate it by pounding his tail on the ground. However, the store proprietor takes it inside just as Pluto begins enjoying himself. Pluto attempts to sneak inside to play the radio some more. However, he accidentally discovers that his tail can function like a record player’s stylus. Pluto then decides to take the record player back to his doghouse and play it out of others’ sight so that it looks like the record player’s sounds are coming out of his mouth. His tactic impresses a group of female dogs, as well as the animals he previously annoyed.

Home media
The short was released on December 19, 2006 on Walt Disney Treasures: The Complete Pluto, Volume Two.

It was also released on the Walt Disney's Classic Cartoon Favorites DVD.

References

External links
 

1947 films
1947 animated films
1940s Disney animated short films
Pluto (Disney) short films
Films scored by Oliver Wallace